James Anthony Abbott (born September 19, 1967) is an American former professional baseball pitcher. He played in Major League Baseball for the California Angels, New York Yankees, Chicago White Sox, and Milwaukee Brewers, from 1989 to 1999. He was successful at the major league level despite having been born without a right hand.

Abbott graduated from Flint Central High School and grew up in the East Village area of Flint, Michigan. While with the University of Michigan, he won the James E. Sullivan Award as the nation's best amateur athlete in 1987 and won a gold medal in the demonstration event at the 1988 Summer Olympics. He was drafted in the first round of the 1988 MLB draft and reached the major leagues the next year. As a member of the Yankees, he threw a no-hitter against the Cleveland Indians in 1993. He retired with a career record of 87 wins and 108 losses, along with a 4.25 earned run average. He currently works as a motivational speaker.

Playing career

Amateur years
Abbott was born in Flint, Michigan. He was picked up by the Ypsilanti, Michigan, American Legion team and went on to win the championship.  He graduated from Flint Central High School in Michigan where he was a stand-out pitcher and quarterback. He played for the Grossi Baseball Club during the summer in the Connie Mack leagues of Michigan.  He was drafted in the 36th round by the Toronto Blue Jays in the 1985 Major League Baseball draft but did not sign, instead enrolling at the University of Michigan.

Abbott played college baseball for the Michigan Wolverines for three years from 1985 to 1988, leading them to two Big Ten Conference championships. In 1987, he won the James E. Sullivan Award as the top amateur athlete in the United States, becoming the first baseball player to win the award. He was the flag-bearer for the United States at the 1987 Pan American Games in Indianapolis, helping lead the US to a second-place finish. Baseball was a demonstration sport in the 1988 Summer Olympics; he pitched the final game, winning an unofficial gold medal for the United States. Abbott was voted the Big Ten Athlete of the Year in 1988.

Abbott's University of Michigan #31 jersey was retired at the Wolverines' April 18, 2009 home game against Michigan State University. In 2007, he was elected to the College Baseball Hall of Fame for his career at Michigan.

MLB career
The California Angels selected Abbott in the first round, with the eighth overall selection, of the 1988 Major League Baseball draft. In 1989, he joined the Angels' starting rotation as a rookie without playing a single minor league game. That season, he posted a 12–12 win–loss record with an earned run average (ERA) of 3.92, and finished fifth in the year's American League (AL) Rookie of the Year Award voting.

In 1991, Abbott went 18–11 for the Angels, who finished in last place in the AL West with an 81–81 record. He posted the fourth-lowest ERA in the AL (2.89) while pitching 243 innings. As a result, he finished third in the AL Cy Young Award voting. In the 1992 season, he posted a 2.77 ERA (fifth-lowest in the AL) but his win–loss record fell to 7–15 for the sixth-place Angels. He also won the Tony Conigliaro Award in 1992.

In the offseason, the Angels attempted to trim payroll and traded Abbott to the New York Yankees for their top minor league prospect first baseman J.T. Snow, pitchers Russ Springer, and Jerry Nielsen. He had an up and down year for the Yankees but on September 4, 1993, Abbott pitched a no-hitter against the Cleveland Indians. On November 26 in the same year, he appeared as himself on the TV series Boy Meets World in the episode "Class Pre-Union".

In 1994, Abbott's Yankees led the AL East, but the season halted, and the playoffs were canceled, due to a players strike on August 12. A free agent after the 1994 season, Abbott signed with the Chicago White Sox in April 1995. On July 27, 1995, the White Sox traded him and Tim Fortugno to the Angels for McKay Christensen, Andrew Lorraine, Bill Simas, and John Snyder. The Angels held an 11-game lead over the Seattle Mariners in August, but lost the AL West division title in a one-game playoff to the Mariners.

Abbott re-signed with the Angels for the 1996 season. He struggled through it, posting a 2–18 record with a 7.48 ERA. The Angels released him before Opening Day of the 1997 season, and he retired.

Abbott returned to the White Sox in 1998, starting five games and winning all five. He continued his comeback the following year with the Milwaukee Brewers, but pitched ineffectively. This was the first time he had played for a National League team, forcing him to bat for the first time in his career. He recorded two hits in 21 at bats during his Brewers stint. Both of his hits scored runs, and both hits came off of Chicago Cubs pitcher Jon Lieber, albeit in different games.

Abbott retired after the 1999 season with a career record of 87–108, with a 4.25 ERA.

Playing with one hand
When preparing to pitch the ball, Abbott would rest his glove on the end of his right forearm.  After releasing the ball, he would quickly slip his hand into the glove, usually in time to field any balls that a two-handed pitcher would be able to field.  Then he would secure the glove between his right forearm and torso, slip his hand out of it, and remove the ball from it, usually in time to throw out the runner at first or sometimes even start a double play.  At all levels, teams tried to exploit his fielding disadvantage by repeatedly bunting to him.

Batting was not an issue for Abbott for the majority of his career, since the American League uses the designated hitter, and he played only two seasons in the interleague play era. But he tripled in a spring training game in 1991 off Rick Reuschel, and when he joined the National League's Milwaukee Brewers in 1999, he had two hits in 21 at-bats, both off Jon Lieber. New York Yankees teammate Mariano Rivera claimed to have witnessed Abbott hitting home runs during batting practice.

His disability inspired him to work harder than most. “As a kid I really wanted to fit in,” Abbott says on his website about growing up with a disability. “Sports became a way for me to gain acceptance. I think this fueled my desire to succeed. I truly believe that difficult times and disappointments can push us to find abilities and strengths we wouldn’t know existed without the experience of struggle.”

Awards 
1986 – Abbott was presented with the United States Sports Academy's Mildred "Babe" Didrikson Zaharias Courage Award for his courageous action in overcoming adversity to excel in sports.
1987 – Abbott won the Golden Spikes Award.
1992 – Abbott was awarded the Tony Conigliaro Award, given annually by the Boston Red Sox to a Major League player who overcomes an obstacle and adversity through the attributes of spirit, determination, and courage that were trademarks of the Boston star.
2003 – Abbott was inducted into the Baseball Reliquary's Shrine of the Eternals.
2014 – Abbott was one of 12 recipients of the Henry Viscardi Achievement Awards.

Autobiography 
 In April 2012, Abbott's autobiography, Imperfect: An Improbable Life, co-written with Tim Brown, was published by Ballantine Books.

See also
List of Major League Baseball no-hitters
Pete Gray
Chad Bentz
University of Michigan Athletic Hall of Honor

References

External links

1967 births
Living people
American disabled sportspeople
American expatriate baseball players in Canada
Sportspeople with limb difference
American amputees
Baseball players at the 1987 Pan American Games
Baseball players at the 1988 Summer Olympics
Baseball players from Flint, Michigan
Birmingham Barons players
Calgary Cannons players
California Angels players
Chicago White Sox players
Baseball players with disabilities
Flint Central High School alumni
Golden Spikes Award winners
Hickory Crawdads players
James E. Sullivan Award recipients
Major League Baseball pitchers
Michigan Wolverines baseball players
Milwaukee Brewers players
New York Yankees players
Sportspeople from Southfield, Michigan
Vancouver Canadians players
Winston-Salem Warthogs players
National College Baseball Hall of Fame inductees
Medalists at the 1988 Summer Olympics
Olympic gold medalists for the United States in baseball
Pan American Games silver medalists for the United States
Pan American Games medalists in baseball
Big Ten Athlete of the Year winners
Medalists at the 1987 Pan American Games